The Orfeo Superdome is an indoor sports arena that is located in Córdoba, Argentina. The arena is primarily used to host basketball, volleyball, boxing, and tennis events. It's also the host venue for most concerts in Córdoba.  The seating capacity of the arena is 14,000 people for sports, and 8,000 to 12,000 people for concerts.

History
Orfeo Superdome's opening was on 6 September 2002, with a concert by rock band Divididos. On 24 January 2010, Orfeo Superdome hosted a concert by Metallica, which sold out within a few hours of being announced. On 12 October 2011, Orfeo Superdomo hosted a concert by Guns And Roses, and six days later hosted Deep Purple.

Orfeo was one of the host venues of the 2002 FIVB Volleyball Men's World Championship, and it also hosted the final round of the 2010 FIVB Volleyball World League. It also hosted the final stage of the 2017 FIBA AmeriCup. The arena has also been used to host some of the Asociación Deportiva Atenas basketball team's home games.

Concerts hosted 
Source: 

 Above & Beyond   2014
 Alan Parsons   2011
 Alejandro Lerner   2010
 Alejandro Sanz   2007, 2010
 Arctic Monkeys   2014
 Armin Van Buuren   2009
 Axel (cantante)   2009
 Babasonicos   2011
 Black Sabbath   2016
 Bob Dylan   2008
 Bryan Adams   2007
 Calle 13   2011
 Callejeros   2007, 2010
 Charly García   2010, 2011
 Chayanne   2011
 Cristian Castro   2015
 Cyndi Lauper   2008
 Daddy Yankee   2010
 Daniela Mercury   2011
 David Bisbal   2010, 2011
 Deep Purple 2011
 Divididos   2004, 2010, 2011
 Don Omar   2008
 Franco De Vita   2011
 Guns N' Roses   2011
 Gustavo Cerati   2009
 Ha*Ash   2016
 Hernan Cattaneo   2007, 2014
 Joaquín Sabina   2010
 José Luis Perales   2016
 Juanes   2012
 Julieta Venegas    2008, 2011
 Julio Iglesias    2016
 La Ley   2008
 La Oreja de Van Gogh  2004, 2007, 2009
 León Gieco   2004
 Les Luthiers   2011
 Liza Minnelli   2009
 Luciano Pereyra   2018
 Luis Alberto Spinetta   2010
 Luis Fonsi   2011
 Luis Miguel   November 16 and 17, 2005 (Mexico En La Piel Tour), November 9 and 10, 2010 (Luis Miguel Tour)
 Maluma 2016, 2017
 Marc Anthony 2012
 Marco Antonio Solis 2012
 Megadeth Countdown To Extinction 20th Anniversary Tour 2012
 Metallica   2010
 Michael Bolton   2008
 Michael Bublé   2012
 Miranda!   2006
 Morrisey   2012
 Muse   2015
 Nick Jonas & The Administration   2011
 Noel Gallagher's High Flying Birds 2012
 Paul Oakenfold   2010
 Paulina Rubio   2007
 Paulo Londra   2019
 Peter Cetera   2010
 Pimpinela   2018
 Queen   2015 featuring Adam Lambert
 RBD   2009
 Ricardo Arjona   2006
 Ricky Martin February 28, 2007 (Black and White Tour), and September 5, 06, 2011 (Música + Alma + Sexo World Tour)
 Ringo Starr   2013
 Robert Plant   2012
 Romeo Santos   2014
 Rosana   2006
 Roxette   2011, 2012
 Satoshi Tomiie   2010
 Sebastian Yatra   2019
 Selena Gomez & The Scene 2012
 Slash    2011
 Slash featuring Myles Kennedy and The Conspirators 2012
 Soy Luna
 Stone Temple Pilots 2010
 Teen Angels 2008, 2009, 2010, 2011 and 2012
 The Hives 2014
 Tom Jones   2010
 Toto   2007
 UB40 2006
 Violetta
 Wisin y Yandel   2010
 Zucchero   2012

References

External links
 
How is the Orfeo Superdome? 

2002 establishments in Argentina
Basketball venues in Argentina
Boxing venues in Argentina
Buildings and structures completed in 2002
Buildings and structures in Córdoba, Argentina
Indoor arenas in Argentina
Sports venues completed in 2002
Sports venues in Córdoba Province, Argentina
Tennis venues in Argentina
Volleyball venues in Argentina